Shahrdari Gonbad Volleyball Club (Bashgah-e Valibal-e Shiherdari Gânbed) is an Iranian professional volleyball team based in Gonbad-e Kavus, Iran. They compete in the Iranian Volleyball Super League.

Notable former players
  Farhad Ghaemi
  Carlos Tejeda
  Marek Mikula

References

External links
 Result
 Iran Premier League 2016

Iranian volleyball clubs